Proseč pod Ještědem is a municipality and village in Liberec District in the Liberec Region of the Czech Republic. It has about 400 inhabitants.

Administrative parts
Villages of Domaslavice, Horka, Javorník and Padouchov are administrative parts of Proseč pod Ještědem.

References

External links

Villages in Liberec District